The 2019 Nigerian Senate election in Kogi State held on February 23, and November 16, 2019. Smart Adeyemi representing Kogi West, Yakubu Oseni representing Kogi Central and Jibrin Isah representing Kogi East all won on the platform of All Progressives Congress, unseating their predecessors in the People's Democratic party.

Overview

Summary

Results

Kogi West 
A total of 24 candidates registered with the Independent National Electoral Commission to contest in the election. APC candidate Smart Adeyemi won the election and the re-run polls, defeating PDP candidate Dino Melaye and 22 other party candidates. Adeyemi received 54.86% of the votes, while Melaye received 38.57%

Kogi Central 
A total of 19 candidates registered with the Independent National Electoral Commission to contest in the election. APC candidate Yakubu Oseni won the election, defeating PDP candidate Ahmed Ogembe, SDP Akpoti Natasha Hadiza and 16 other party candidates. Oseni received 52.87% of the votes, Akpoti received 33.35% while Ogembe received 12.73%.

Kogi East 
A total of 24 candidates registered with the Independent National Electoral Commission to contest in the election. APC candidate Jibrin Isah won the election, defeating PDP candidate Ali Atai Aidoko Usman and 22 other party candidates. Jibrin received 54.50% of the votes, while Aidoko received 30.13%.

Re-run Elections 
The November 16, election in Kogi West was declared inconclusive due to voting irregularities. A re-run election was held on November 30, 2019 and Smart Adeyemi of the PDP emerged winner.

References 

Kogi State senatorial elections